The Transitional Islamic State of Afghanistan (TISA), also known as the Afghan Transitional Authority, was the name of a temporary administration of Afghanistan put in place by the loya jirga of June 2002. It succeeded the original Islamic State of Afghanistan and preceded the Islamic Republic of Afghanistan (2004–2021).

Background
Following the invasion of Afghanistan, a UN-sponsored conference of Afghan leaders in Bonn, Germany, led to the appointment of the Afghan Interim Administration under the chairmanship of Hamid Karzai. However, this Interim Administration, which was not broadly representative, was scheduled to last for only six months, before being replaced by a
Transitional Administration. The move to this second stage would require the convening of a traditional Afghan "grand assembly", called a Loya Jirga. This Emergency Loya Jirga elected a new Head of State and appointed the Transitional Administration, which, in turn, would run the country for a maximum of two more years until a "fully representative government" could be elected through free and fair elections.

History

Electing a head of state
The most important thing the Loya Jirga had to do was to choose a president for the Transitional Administration who would lead the country until the official presidential elections in 2004. Initially, there were two candidates who had declared to run: former president of Afghanistan and Northern Alliance leader Burhanuddin Rabbani and the American-backed chairman of the Afghan Interim Administration Hamid Karzai. Karzai was also supported by Abdullah Abdullah and Mohammad Fahim, two important leaders of the Northern Alliance. 
A third possible candidate was Zahir Shah, former king of Afghanistan until 1973. He had spent years living in Rome but had returned to Afghanistan after the fall of the Taliban regime. Already at the Bonn Conference which installed the interim administration there was a group of supporters of Zahir Shah, called the Rome-group, who wanted to take the former king to take up the position of head of state.

Upon arrival in Kabul, more than 800 delegates signed a petition urging the nomination of Zahir Shah as Head of State, if only as a figurehead. In view of the speculation, which the petition aroused, United States and United Nations representatives pressed the former King to withdraw. The start of the Loya Jirga was delayed from 10 to 11 June because of "logistical and preparatory problems." On 10 June the American representative Zalmay Khalilzad gave a press conference in which he declared that Zahir Shah was not a candidate. The same day, in a press conference of Zahir Shah the former king confirmed this and said "I have no intention of restoring the monarchy. I am not a candidate for any position in the Loya Jirga." Hamid Karzai, who sat next to Zahir Shah at the press conference called Zahir Shah the "father of the nation" and thanked him for the "confidence His Majesty has put in me." The next day former President Burhanuddin Rabbani withdrew his candidacy for Head of State in favour of Hamid Karzai "for the sake of national unity"

So it looked like Karzai would go into the race for head of government uncontested, but two other candidates emerged. To be on the ballot at the Loya Jirga a candidate had to submit 150 signatures for his candidacy. Glam Fareq Majidi gathered only 101 signatures, so he was disqualified as a candidate. Former mujahedeen fighter, Mohammed Asef Mohsoni submitted a list with 1,050 names for Karzai and also Masooda Jalal, a woman doctor working with the World Food Programme, and Mahfoz Nadai, an Uzbek army officer, poet and a deputy government minister gathered enough signatures to be on the ballot.

The election for president of the transitional administration was held by secret ballot on 13 June 2002 — with black-and-white photos of the candidates adjacent to their names. Hamid Karzai was chosen with an overwhelming majority of 83% and stayed in office as President.

|-
!style="background-color:#E9E9E9" align=left|Candidates
!style="background-color:#E9E9E9" align=right|Votes
!style="background-color:#E9E9E9" align=right|%
|-
|align="left" |Hamid Karzai
|align="right" |1,295
|align="right" |83%
|-
|align="left" |Masooda Jalal
|align="right" |171
|align="right" |11%
|-
|align="left" |Mahfoz Nadai
|align="right" |89
|align="right" |6%
|-
|align="left" |Total Votes
|align="right" |1555 
|align="right" |100%
|}

Appointing the government ministers
On 18 June, the day that Karzai would present his cabinet to the Loya Jirga he told the loya jirga that he needed one more day to make his final list.

On 19 June, the last day of the Loya Jirga, Karzai announced to the Loya Jirga the names of 14 ministers of the future Afghan transitional administration, including three Vice-Presidents. He also named a Chief Justice. 
"Do you accept this Cabinet," Karzai asked the loya jirga. After hands went up in support, he said, "All have accepted it and I am happy about it." This led to some controversy, since delegates stated that there had not been a proper vote and that the cabinet had not been democratically selected, but was the result of political negotiations parallel at the loya jirga.

All three posts of Vice-President Karzai named were given to commanders of the Northern Alliance though Karzai was careful to make sure none of the vice-presidents were from the same ethnic background. 
After the Loya Jirga there was some controversies about the government Karzai had named and several names were added to the list before the actual cabinet was sworn in on 24 June, to appease certain factions within Afghanistan. On 22 June Karzai presented the more cabinet members, making the total number of ministers 29. This cabinet was installed at 24 June 2002. But due to controversy around the post of Woman's Affairs Minister this point stayed vacant.
Before the end of June Karzai named a Stat adviser to the Women's Affairs Ministry and later also a formal Women's Affairs Minister. In these last days of June Karzai also added two more vice-presidents and another National Security Adviser.

More Pashtun representation
The interim government, led by a Pashtun, had 12 Tajiks and 9 Pashtuns as part of its cabinet of ministers. Hence, Pashtuns wanted the following transitional administration to be more representative. In the new administration there were 13 Pashtun ministers among the 30 ministers. The rest of the cabinet was made up of 7 Tajiks, 3 Uzbeks, 2 Hazaras, 2 non-Hazara Shi'ites, and 1 Turkmen.

Cabinet of warlords
The Pasthun element in the Transitional administration was stronger than in the interim administration and the loya jirga was meant in part to increase civilian influence in the government. However, in many ways Afghanistan's military factions and warlords increased and further legitimized their power during the loya jirga. During and after the loya jirga, army and police officials threatened, imprisoned, and even killed candidates to stop them from running for the loya jirga, or to intimidate them from acting independently The Northern Alliance still dominated the government. The three vice-presidents Karzai announced on the Loya Jirga, Khalili, Qadir and Fahim were all Northern Alliance commanders, although none of them had the same ethnic background. The powerful Tajik Jamiat-e Islami trio Fahim, Qanuni and Abdullah kept important positions in the new cabinet.

The powerful warlord Ismail Khan was not part of the administration, but he was represented by his son, Mir Wais Saddiq. However Saddiq was assassinated in 2004 while being in office as minister.
Another powerful warlord, the Uzbek Abdul Rashid Dostum was also not part of the cabinet, however there was one Uzbek more in the transitional administration than in the interim administration.

In the years after the government was put in place, President Karzai made some efforts to limit the worst effects of warlord dominance, for example by replacing the relatively weak Pashtun who led the ministry of Interior by the more reform-minded Ali Ahmad Jalali.

Adding royalists
At the Loya Jirga Karzai named former King Zahir Shah the Father of the Nation. However, some of the king's supporters thought that an honorary title wasn't enough for the king and they had rather seen him in an official position as president, with Karzai in a position as prime minister. Also, two of the Kings loyalist Hedayat Amin Arsala and Abdul Rassoul Amin had lost the position they had in the interim government. Because the members loyal to Zahir Shah, united in the 'Rome group' thought they had to less influence, Karzai added in end June Zalmay Rassoul as Security Adviser and Amin Arsala as a fifth vice-president.

Western-schooled intellectuals
Karzai was also under pressure to put some highly educated Afghans on the administration who had become refugees during the Communist rule or Taliban rule of Afghanistan and had been schooled by western universities. The most remarkable person Karzai put in his administration was Ashraf Ghani, who worked at the World Bank, as Finance Minister. Juma Mohammedi who became Mines Minister was also a World Bank employee. The new Interior Minister, Taj Mohammad Wardak, held American citizenship, as did Ali Ahmad Jalali, who replaced him as Interior Minister in January 2003.

Opposition from Yunus Qanuni
Because of this issue of Pashtun under representation, Yunus Qanuni, one of the important Northern Alliance leaders, told the opening session he would be resigning as minister of the important post of interior so Karzai could strengthen the national government by broadening its ethnic mix. Yunus Qanuni, the former Interior minister, was unhappy with the post of Education Minister he had been assigned, since he had expected to become something like prime minister. Qanuni said he considered not joining the government at all. The rank-and-file Panjshiri troops who dominate the Interior Ministry temporarily blocked off the roads around the Interior Ministry complex in Kabul on 20 and 21 June and brandished weapons to demonstrate that their loyalties remain with Qanuni. They denied the New Interior Minister, the 80-year-old Taj Mohammad Wardak, access to the Interior ministry. 
After Karzai appointed Qanuni special adviser on security, through which he retained unofficial control over the Afghan intelligence apparatus and became de facto supervisor of Wardak, he decided to join the administration anyway, but he also formed a party outside of the government and run for president in the next elections.

Women's affairs
There was also controversy around the post of minister for woman's affairs: Interim Women's Affairs Minister Sima Samar had been very outspoken and she had been threatened and complaints against her were filed by the supreme court who eventually decided not to charge her with blasphemy. Because at the Loya Jirga Samar wasn't on the list there was initially no minister appointed for woman's affairs. Karzai later appointed Government Mahbuba Huquqmal as State Representative in the Women's Affairs Ministry and after that Habiba Sarabi as formal minister of Women's Affairs.

The killing of Abdul Qadir
The Pashtun vice-president was Haji Abdul Qadeer, one of the few Northern Alliance commanders of Pashtun ethnic origin. On July 6, 2002, Qadir and his son-in-law were killed by gunmen in a surprise attack with unknown motive. In 2004, one man was sentenced to death and two others to prison sentences for the killing.

Composition of the Transitional Administration

References

States and territories established in 2002
States and territories disestablished in 2002
Former political entities in Afghanistan
Executive branch of the government of Afghanistan
2000s in Afghanistan
Provisional governments
History of Afghanistan (1992–present)
 01
Government agencies established in 2002
Government agencies disestablished in 2004
2002 establishments in Afghanistan
2004 disestablishments in Afghanistan
2004 disestablishments in Asia